Thomas C. Warner (born 1979) is a British poet.

He graduated with an MA with Distinction in Creative Writing from the University of East Anglia in 2002. He won an Eric Gregory Award in 2001, and was commended in the National Poetry Competition 2014.

Awards
2001 Eric Gregory Award

Bibliography
 Faber New Poets 8 (2010)
 Yoga (2014)

References

1979 births
Living people
Alumni of the University of East Anglia
British poets
British male poets